"The Last Song" is a power ballad song by American hard rock band Poison. It was the second and final single from their 2000 album, Power to the People.

"The Last Song" was one of five new tracks on the half live half studio album, the others being "Power to the People" (first single), "Strange", Can't Bring Me Down" and for the first time on vocals C.C. DeVille sings the track "I Hate Every Bone In Your Body But Mine". The song was released as a single in July 2000 under the bands Cyanide Records.

Live performance
The song has only been played three times by the band once on the "Power to the People" tour once on the "Glam, Slam, Metal, Jam" Tour and once on the "Hollyweird" tour.

Lyrics
The lyrics describe lost love; it describes the narrators "last day" and "last song".

Track listing
 Track 1 - "The Last Song"
 Track 2 - "Strange"

Strange
The B-side is the album track "Strange" which has been played live by the band a couple times on the Power to the People Tour in 2000.

Albums
"The Last Song" is on the following albums.

 Power to the People
 Best of Ballads & Blues
 The Best of Poison: 20 Years of Rock

Personnel
Credits are adapted from liner notes of "Power to the People".
 Bret Michaels - Lead vocals, Rhythm guitar, Keyboards
 C.C. DeVille - Lead guitar, Backing vocals
 Bobby Dall - Bass guitar, Backing vocals
 Rikki Rockett - Drums, Backing vocals

References

2000 singles
Poison (American band) songs
2000 songs
Songs written by Bret Michaels
Songs written by Rikki Rockett
Songs written by Bobby Dall
Songs written by C.C. DeVille